The Ghiurca Mare is a left tributary of the river Bâsca in Romania. It discharges into the Bâsca near Comandău.

References

Rivers of Romania
Rivers of Covasna County